William Albert Love (1911 – 8 November 1943) was a Welsh boxer who competed for England in the 1930 British Empire Games. He was born in Cardiff. At the 1930 Empire Games, he won the bronze medal in the lightweight class.

Love was the Welsh champion in 1930. He died in a Japanese prison camp in November 1943.

External links

commonwealthgames.com results
"City's boxing greats make for a heavyweight heritage"

1911 births
1943 deaths
Boxers from Cardiff
Welsh male boxers
Lightweight boxers
Boxers at the 1930 British Empire Games
Commonwealth Games bronze medallists for England
Prisoners who died in Japanese detention
Welsh people who died in prison custody
World War II prisoners of war held by Japan
Commonwealth Games medallists in boxing
British Army personnel killed in World War II
Royal Artillery soldiers
Military personnel from Cardiff
Medallists at the 1930 British Empire Games